Life, the Universe, & Everything: The Marion K. "Doc" Smith Symposium on Science Fiction and Fantasy is an academic conference held annually since 1983 in Provo, Utah. It is the longest-running science fiction and fantasy convention in Utah, and one of the largest and longest-running academic science fiction conferences. An annual proceedings volume, Deep Thoughts (named after the computer Deep Thought from The Hitchhiker's Guide to the Galaxy), publishes the academic papers and main addresses given at the event. The symposium was named, jokingly, after the Douglas Adams novel Life, the Universe and Everything.

History
The roots of the Life, the Universe, & Everything (LTUE) and other science fiction efforts at Brigham Young University (BYU) began with a one-day symposium on science fiction held on January 20, 1976. Four years later, Orson Scott Card gave a speech in 1980 at the university about morality in writing, which showed some of the students and faculty that a serious, academic forum for discussion of science fiction writing was a possibility at BYU, but there weren't enough students interested in trying to make things work at that time.

This changed in February 1982 when Ben Bova was invited to speak at a university forum event. The English Department assigned Marion Smith, the professor whose name is now part of the title of the symposium, to take care of Bova while he wasn't speaking. He and a handful of his writing students (including M. Shayne Bell) got together and held a discussion with Bova. This inspired those students to try to create something like that the following year, when they invited Card back to be the first guest of honor. The first official symposium was held in 1983.

From 1982 through 2011, the symposium was held at BYU. In 2012, it was held at Utah Valley University, and in 2013, it moved to the Provo Marriott Hotel and Conference Center in downtown Provo.

The Leading Edge science fiction and fantasy magazine was started by these same students, all members of a 1980 creative writing class at BYU.

Guests
This is a list of Guests of Honor (in bold) and notable Special Guests.

Explanatory notes

References

External links

 

1983 establishments in Utah
Brigham Young University
Provo, Utah
Science fiction conventions in the United States
Recurring events established in 1983